Linda Gottlieb is an American television writer and film producer.

Early life and education
Born in New Jersey, Gottlieb graduated from Wellesley College in 1960 and received an M.A. from the Russian Institute of Columbia University in 1961.

Career

Production credits
Examples of projects she has worked on include:

Films
Limbo (1972), film starring Kate Jackson
 The Immigrant Experience: The Long Long Journey (1972)
 The Fur Coat Club (1973), film short
 Summer of My German Soldier (1978), made-for-TV movie
 The Mating Season (1980)
We're Fighting Back (1981), TV movie
The Electric Grandmother (January 17, 1982),  a television movie that originally aired on NBC as a 60-minute "Peacock Project" special
 Dirty Dancing (1987)
 Citizen Cohn (1992) cable TV film
The Gentleman Bandit (2002)
 Soldier's Girl (2003)

Television episodes, series, and specials
 13 Bourbon Street (1997), TV pilot
 ABC Afterschool Specials
ABC Weekend Specials 
NBC Special Treat
 One Life to Live (Executive Producer: 1991-1994); replaced Paul Rauch; hired Michael Malone and Josh Griffith. Entertainment Weekly wrote: "OLTL (circa late 1991–1994) was airing some of the most literate drama ever to hit daytime—too good to be called 'soap opera.'"
 SoapLine, a TV series characterized as "a joint production of ABC News and ABC Daytime to bring viewers storyline updates, special features and interviews during breaks in live, pre-emptive coverage of the O. J. Simpson trial"

Teaching
She is an Adjunct Professor (Master Class in Screenwriting: One on One with a Producer) at Tisch School of the Arts.

Collaborators

Gottlieb has worked with writer/producers such as Marsha Norman (in Face of a Stranger which was presented by Linda Gottlieb and which Norman was a writer on), and Frank Pierson (on Citizen Cohn and Soldier's Girl, the latter which Gottlieb produced and Pierson directed)

Awards and nominations
Gottlieb has been nominated for 5 Daytime Emmy Awards, Outstanding Children's Anthology/Dramatic Programming (1980), and Outstanding Children's Entertainment Special (1977 & 1979)'', for three Emmy Awards (1979, 1982 & 1993), and for an Independent Spirit Award (1988) and a Peabody Award.

References

External links
 
 
 
 
 
 
 
 
 
 
 
 
 
 
 
 15
 
 
 
 
 

Living people
Soap opera producers
American film producers
Year of birth missing (living people)
Emmy Award winners
Columbia University alumni
Wellesley College alumni
Tisch School of the Arts faculty